Northwell is a parliamentary ward of the Luton, in the north of Luton, in the ceremonial county of Bedfordshire, England. The ward contains the suburb of Marsh Farm.

Northwell ward is represented by Cllr Anne Donelon (Labour) and Cllr Yasmin Waheed (Labour).

The ward forms part of the parliamentary constituency of Luton North and the MP is Sarah Owen (Labour).

References

 Luton Borough Council

Wards of Luton